Maria Isabella Simone Arroyo Magalona-Bacarro (born November 23, 1988), better known as Saab Magalona, is  a Filipina actress, singer, and blogger who started in the TV5 youth-oriented drama series Lipgloss. She is the daughter of Francis Magalona and sister of Maxene Magalona, Frank Magalona & Elmo Magalona. In music, she is a member of the 8-piece indie rock band Cheats, where she acts as co-lead vocalist, alongside Candy Gamos and her husband, Jim Bacarro.

Career
In 2007, she made her first onscreen appearance as the friend of Eleanor (played by Alessandra de Rossi) in the GMA Network telefantasya Kamandag where her sister Maxene played the role of one of Richard Gutierrez' leading ladies. In 2008, she joined the cast of TV5's Lipgloss. In October 2010, she made her GMA comeback on the teleserye Koreana, playing Ivy.

Her music career began when she filled-in for several indie bands such as Us-2 Evil-0 (2009), Duster, and BBYGRL (2012). A few years later, she and Jim Bacarro formed the band called Cheats following the disbandment of Bacarro's band Ernville.

In 2018, she returned to television and signed up with ABS-CBN as the new host of music program Coke Studio Homecoming.

Personal life
Her father is the late Filipino rapper and actor Francis Magalona; her grandparents are the late actors Pancho Magalona and Tita Duran. She took up creative writing at the Ateneo de Manila University.

On January 24, 2015, she married her boyfriend and fellow Cheats band member, Jim Bacarro, in a private ceremony that was held in St. Ignatius Chapel inside the Philippine Military Academy in Baguio. The ceremony was attended by the couple's family and close friends. This included Saab's siblings Frank, Elmo, and Maxene, who also served as the maid of honor; Miss World 2013 Megan Young and her sister Lauren Young, both part of the bridal entourage; Janine Gutierrez; and comedian Michael V., one of the principal sponsors.

In September 2017, Magalona announced that she and Bacarro were expecting twins. Later on, she suffered a miscarriage and lost her baby girl (Luna Isabel M. Bacarro), but the baby boy (Pancho Gerardo M. Bacarro) survived and stayed in the NICU for months. They named her son after her paternal grandfather, Pancho Magalona.

In September 2019, Magalona gave birth to another son, Vito Tomas.

Filmography

Television

Music career
Albums with Cheats
Cheats (2016)

References

1988 births
Living people
Saab
Filipino child actresses
Filipino television actresses
Ateneo de Manila University alumni
21st-century Filipino actresses
Actresses from Manila
GMA Network personalities
TV5 (Philippine TV network) personalities
ABS-CBN personalities